Marco Luiz Brito (born August 4, 1977) is a retired Brazilian footballer.

Club statistics

References

External links

1977 births
Living people
Brazilian expatriate footballers
J1 League players
Cypriot First Division players
Fluminense FC players
Coritiba Foot Ball Club players
CR Vasco da Gama players
Santa Cruz Futebol Clube players
Associação Atlética Ponte Preta players
América Futebol Clube (RN) players
Centro Sportivo Alagoano players
Yokohama F. Marinos players
APOEL FC players
Expatriate footballers in Japan
Expatriate footballers in Cyprus
Association football forwards
Footballers from Rio de Janeiro (city)
Brazilian footballers